Tomasz Piotr Sajdak (born 11 October 1984) is a Polish retired professional footballer who played as a striker and midfielder. He also holds German citizenship. He played in eleven countries. In Poland, Germany, Faroe Islands, Latvia, Finland, Cyprus, Bulgaria, Iran, Åland, Denmark and Luxembourg.

Career

Wisla Plock
Sajdak won the Polish Cup with Wisla Plock in the 2005–06 season.

HJK
Sajdak joined Veikkausliiga side HJK on 16 April 2008 on a Bosman transfer. He made his debut on 28 April 2008 against IFK Mariehamn and scored his first goal for the club. His first hat-trick for HJK came on 19 May 2008 against Tampere United in a 5–1 home victory. He won the Finnish Cup in 2008.

Slavia Sofia
On 1 September 2009, Sajdak signed a contract with Bulgarian side Slavia Sofia.

Honours
Wisla Plock
 Polish Cup: 2005–06

HJK Helsinki
 Finnish Cup: 2008

References

External links
  Tomasz Sajdak profile - 90minut.pl

Living people
1984 births
People from Szczecinek
Sportspeople from West Pomeranian Voivodeship
Association football midfielders
Association football forwards
Polish footballers
Polish expatriate footballers
Expatriate footballers in Iran
SV Werder Bremen players
Hannover 96 II players
Kickers Emden players
Wisła Płock players
Radomiak Radom players
GÍ Gøta players
HK Liepājas Metalurgs players
Helsingin Jalkapalloklubi players
Alki Larnaca FC players
PFC Slavia Sofia players
Aluminium Hormozgan F.C. players
IFK Mariehamn players
Berliner FC Dynamo players
Ekstraklasa players
Veikkausliiga players
Cypriot First Division players
First Professional Football League (Bulgaria) players